Super Ape Inna Jungle is an album by Lee 'Scratch' Perry and Mad Professor, released in 1995.

Track listing
"I'm Not A Human Being"
"Nasty Spell"
"Writing On The Wall"
"Why Complaining?"
"Thunder And Lightning"
"Super Ape Inna Jungle"
"Jungle Roots"
"Black Spell"
"Dancing Boots"
"Sheba Dance"

1995 albums
Lee "Scratch" Perry albums
Mad Professor albums
Albums produced by Lee "Scratch" Perry